20 Feet from Stardom is a 2013 American documentary film directed by documentary filmmaker Morgan Neville and produced by Gil Friesen, a music industry executive whose curiosity to know more about the lives of background singers inspired the making of the film.

The film follows the behind-the-scenes experiences of backup singers and stars Darlene Love, Judith Hill, Merry Clayton, Lisa Fischer, Tata Vega, and Jo Lawry, among many others. On March 2, 2014, it won the Academy Award for Best Documentary Feature at the 86th Academy Awards, 23 years after the similar documentary In the Shadow of the Stars (which focused on the members of an opera chorus instead of its stars) won the same award.

Lisa Fischer said of backup singing:  "I reject the notion that the job you excel at is somehow not enough to aspire to, that there has to be something more. I love supporting other artists." She added: "Some people will do anything to be famous. I just wanted to sing."

Cast

 Lou Adler
 Stevvi Alexander
 Patti Austin
 Chris Botti
 Ava Cherry
 Merry Clayton
 Sheryl Crow
 Lisa Fischer
 Susaye Greene
 Judith Hill
 Mick Jagger
 Mable John
 Gloria Jones
 David Lasley
 Jo Lawry
 Claudia Lennear
 Darlene Love
 Lynn Mabry
 Bette Midler
 Cindy Mizelle
 Janice Pendarvis
 Nicki Richards
 Bruce Springsteen
 Sting
 Rose Stone (née Stewart)
 Tata Vega
 Martha Wash
 The Waters (Oren, Maxine and Julia Waters)
 Stevie Wonder

 Archival footage

 David Bowie
 Ray Charles
 Michael Jackson
 Elton John
 Tom Jones
 David Letterman
 Kylie Minogue
 Ike & Tina Turner
 Luther Vandross

Release
On January 17, 2013, the film premiered at the 2013 Sundance Film Festival. At Sundance, the film was acquired by Radius-The Weinstein Company and was released nationwide on June 14, 2013. The film was also acquired for international distribution by Elle Driver / Wild Bunch. The film was screened at many film festivals in 2013 including, South by Southwest Film Festival, True/False Film Festival, Full Frame Documentary Film Festival, Hawaii International Film Festival, Philadelphia Music Film Festival, RiverRun Film Festival, San Francisco Film Festival, Seattle International Film Festival, Montclair Film Festival, among others.

Reception

Box office 
The film was a box office success, grossing $4,946,445 in the domestic box office and $898,560 internationally for a worldwide total of $5,845,005.

Critical reception 
20 Feet from Stardom received critical acclaim. The review aggregator website Rotten Tomatoes reports a 99% approval rating with an average rating of 8/10 based on 128 reviews. The website's critical consensus reads "Rich, insightful, and occasionally heartbreaking, 20 Feet From Stardom is an energetic tribute to the passion, talent, and hard work of backup singers." Metacritic gave the film a score of 83 out of 100, based on 25 reviews, indicating "universal acclaim".

The Ithaca Times compared the film to the 2012 book The Wrecking Crew: The Inside Story of Rock and Roll's Best-Kept Secret, which focused on uncredited studio musicians during the same era.

Accolades
At the 86th Academy Awards, it won the Academy Award for Best Documentary Feature. At the 19th Critics' Choice Awards, it also won the Best Documentary Film award. At the 2015 Grammy Awards, it won Best Music Film.

References

External links
 
 
 
 
 

2013 films
2013 documentary films
American documentary films
American independent films
Best Documentary Feature Academy Award winners
Documentary films about singers
Grammy Award for Best Long Form Music Video
Films directed by Morgan Neville
2013 independent films
Documentary films about the music industry
2010s English-language films
2010s American films